William Jones (26 February 1676 – 29 November 1725), born Kidwelly, Wales, was Principal of Jesus College, Oxford, from 1720 to 1725. He had previously been a student of the college, obtaining his BA in 1697, his MA in 1700, his BD in 1708 and his DD in 1720.

References

1676 births
1725 deaths
People from Carmarthenshire
Alumni of Jesus College, Oxford
Fellows of Jesus College, Oxford
Principals of Jesus College, Oxford
People from Kidwelly